Kingsley Fobi (born 20 September 1998) is a Ghanaian professional footballer who plays as a right back.

Club career

Early career
Fobi was born in Cape Coast and started his career in the Right to Dream Academy, before agreeing to a deal Udinese in January 2016; he was subsequently assigned to Granada CF. He made his senior debut with Granada's B-team on 28 January 2017, coming on as a late substitute for Sergio Peña in a 3–0 Segunda División B home win against Mérida AD.

Watford
Fobi had his federative rights assigned to Watford in 2017, being subsequently loaned to SD Formentera in the third division on 26 July of that year. Loans to UD Ibiza and CD Badajoz followed, but he featured sparingly for both sides before leaving Watford in 2020 without making a competitive appearance for the club.

Granada return
On 19 August 2020, Fobi returned to Granada and their B-side, after agreeing to a two-year contract. He made his first team – and La Liga – debut on 8 November, replacing Kenedy at half-time in a 0–2 away loss against Real Sociedad, as his side was heavily impacted by the COVID-19 pandemic.

International career
Fobi represented Ghana at under-20 and under-23 levels, playing for the former in the 2015 FIFA U-20 World Cup.

References

External links

1998 births
Living people
People from Cape Coast
Ghanaian footballers
Association football fullbacks
La Liga players
Segunda División B players
Club Recreativo Granada players
SD Formentera players
UD Ibiza players
CD Badajoz players
Watford F.C. players
Granada CF footballers
Ghana youth international footballers
Ghanaian expatriate footballers
Ghanaian expatriate sportspeople in Spain
Ghanaian expatriate sportspeople in England
Expatriate footballers in Spain
Expatriate footballers in England